The Reluctant Tommy is a book compiled by Duncan Barrett from the memoirs of Ronald Skirth, a member of the Royal Garrison Artillery during the First World War.  His experiences during the Battle of Messines, the Battle of Passchendaele and the Second Battle of the Piave River, which Skirth calls the Battle of the Asiago Plateau, were detailed in this book. The book captured attention due to Skirth's actions during the war to avoid enemy casualties.  The manuscript was known only by the family for decades before finally being published in 2010. The book received favourable reviews on publication, but was also criticised for significant historical inaccuracies.

History

After coming home from the war Ronald Skirth entered the teaching profession.  When he retired in 1971 he started work writing about his wartime memories of the First World War, and in particular his experience of disillusionment.  Although he initially intended to focus on his relationship with his wife Ella, touching on the war only briefly, he soon felt under a "compulsion" to write more about his war experiences.  He worked on the memoir for over a year, eventually filling five green ring binders with many hundreds of pages, and over the next few years, despite suffering two strokes, he repeatedly went back to the material, editing, amending and adding to what he had written.

Publication

In 2010 the memoir was published in book form by Macmillan, as The Reluctant Tommy: Ronald Skirth's Extraordinary Memoir of the First World War, edited by Duncan Barrett.  Barrett wrote in an introduction that he felt that Skirth's story "deserved as wide an audience as possible—and to be read in its protagonist's own words".  Skirth's daughter Jean, who had given permission for the memoir to be published remained uncertain whether publishing the memoir was what her father would have wanted, but believed that it was important that his story was widely known.  The book carried a foreword by Channel 4 News anchor Jon Snow, in which he wrote about his grandfather Lieutenant-General Sir Thomas D'Oyly Snow. Referring to the popular description of the lower ranks as "lions led by donkeys", Snow acknowledged that "If Ronald Skirth was a 'lion', Thom Snow was ultimately a 'donkey'."

Critical reaction
The Reluctant Tommy received largely favourable reviews – for example by Richard Holmes in the Evening Standard and Jonathan Gibbs in the Financial Times – as well as coverage in Socialist Worker and, in an article written by the book's editor, the Sunday Express.

Not all criticism has been favourable. A review in the BBC's Who Do You Think You Are magazine remarks on the disparities between official war records and Skirth's version of events:

In response to general criticism received after initial publication that Skirth was a liar or a fantasist, Barrett revised his introduction to the paperback edition, published in 2011. He recognised that there were discrepancies between Skirth's account and historical sources which made his book an unreliable history, but still considered the book a valuable memoir of one man's personal experiences.

In 2011, The Sunday Times reported that Skirth had been "...exposed for character assassination..." and that the Imperial War Museum, which had held Skirth's memoirs since 1999, "...has admitted they are mostly fictional". The report was based on research begun by Ruth Ward as part of a campaign to clear the name of her grandfather, Bernard Bromley, who had served with Skirth and whose character Skirth had besmirched. Ward's research, which was lodged with the Imperial War Museum when it was completed in 2014, identified significant discrepancies in Skirth's account. It revealed differences in the biographical information of characters and in events described by Skirth when compared to official historical sources. Ward concludes that "Skirth's war memoir was not a genuine account, or a semi-fictional one, but a satire" which "unfairly represented genuine figures" to "subtly and implicitly" ridicule the shortcomings of the British Army.

Bibliography
Notes

References 

 - Total pages: 324 
 

2010 non-fiction books
Personal accounts of World War I